Holdfast most often refers to:

Holdfast (biology), a root-like structure that anchors aquatic sessile organisms to their substrate
Holdfast (tool), a tool used to secure a workpiece to a workbench or anvil

Holdfast or hold fast may also refer to:

Places
 Holdfast, Worcestershire, a village in the Malvern Hills District in England
 Holdfast, Saskatchewan, a village in Canada

Arts and entertainment

Music
 Hold Fast (album), a 2012 album, or the title song, by the Crookes
 Hold Fast: Acoustic Sessions, a 2018 album by Face to Face
 Hold Fast, a 2020 album by Stick in the Wheel
 "Hold Fast" (song), a 2006 song by MercyMe
 "Hold Fast", a 2010 song by Honor Bright from Action! Drama! Suspense!

Other media
 Hold Fast, a travel documentary film by Moxie Marlinspike
 Holdfast: Nations at War, a video game set during the Napoleonic Wars; see Napoleonic Wars in fiction

Other uses
 Hold Fast, the motto of the Clan MacLeod
 Holdfast, a common name in the South of England for Sellotape
 Holdfast (artillery), a plinth or pedestal to which an anti-aircraft or coastal battery gun was fitted
 Codename for the 1962 Ceylonese coup d'état attempt

See also
Avast (disambiguation), a cognate of hold fast
Holdfast Bay (disambiguation)